"Set Pieces" is the first EP release by Canadian indie band Braids. The EP was released in 2008 under the band's original name, The Neighbourhood Council.

Recording 
The EP was recorded at CJSW in Calgary, Canada in April 2008.

Track listing

References

2008 EPs
Braids (band) albums